Military history of Syria

Antiquity
Military history of the Assyrian Empire
Military history of Persia
Sassanid army

Middle Ages
Islamic conquest of Persia
1251–1259 Mongol invasion of Persia, Syria and Mesopotamia
Growth of the Ottoman Empire, Selim I

Modern
French Mandate of Syria
1948 Arab–Israeli War
Six-Day War
Yom Kippur War (part of the Golan Heights conflict)
Syrian occupation of Lebanon
1982 Lebanon War
2011 Syrian uprising

Sources
The Middle East: 2000 Years of History From The Rise of Christianity to the Present Day, Bernard Lewis, London: Weidenfeld & Nicolson, 1995.
Qajar Studies: War and Peace in the Qajar Era, Journal of the Qajar Studies Association, London: 2005.

See also
History of Syria
Military of Syria